Viola Bartlette was a blues singer and actress who recorded on Black Swan Records and Paramount Records. She was from Baltimore. She recorded under the pseudonym Ida Lewis for Silvertone.

She often was a backup singer for Lovie Austin and accompanied Lovie Austin's Blue Serenaders band and Blythe's Sinful Five on records. Johnny Dodds accompanied Bartlette on records in the 1920s. Clarinetist Jimmy O'Bryant backed her on session recordings during 1923 to 1926. She also recorded with Kid Ory.

Discography
"Tennessee Blues" (1925)
"Go Back Where You Stayed Last Night" (c. 1925) by Lovie Austin's Blue Serenaders
"Walk Easy 'Cause My Papa's Here (1926), Paramount
"Shake That Thing" by Papa Charlie Jackson
"Anna Mina Forty And St. Louis Shorty" (1926) by Jimmy Blythe / Blythe's Sinful Five
"Quit Knocking on my Door" (1926) by Blythe's Sinful Five

References

Year of birth missing
Year of death missing
Actresses from Baltimore
Musicians from Baltimore
American blues singers
Paramount Records artists